Artem Shelestynskiy (born 17 October 1990) is a  Ukrainian professional footballer. After leaving Stal Alchevsk, he has been playing for amateur clubs for a decade.

External links
Profile on Official Site 
 
 

1990 births
Living people
Ukrainian footballers
FC Stal Alchevsk players
FC Stal-2 Alchevsk players
FC Tytan Donetsk players
FC Lysychansk players
Association football midfielders